The Trammps III is the fifth studio album by the American soul-disco group the Trammps, released in 1977 through Atlantic Records.

Commercial performance
The album peaked at No. 27 on the R&B albums chart. It also reached No. 85 on the Billboard 200. The album includes the singles "The Night the Lights Went Out", which peaked at No. 80 on the Hot Soul Singles chart, and "Seasons for Girls", which charted at No. 50 on the Hot Soul Singles chart.

Track listing

Personnel
The Trammps
Earl Young
Harold Wade 
Stanley Wade 
Robert Upchurch 
Jimmy Ellis

Additional Personnel
Norman Harris, Bobby Eli, T.J. Tindall – guitars
Ron "Have Mercy" Kersey, Bruce Gray, Carlton Kent – keyboards
Ron Baker, Sugar Bear Foreman – bass
Earl Young – drums
T.G. Conway – synthesizer
Don Renaldo and His Strings and Horns (except on "Love Per Hour" horns by Fred Wesley and The Horny Horns)

Charts
Album

Singles

References

External links

1977 albums
The Trammps albums
Albums produced by Norman Harris
Albums recorded at Sigma Sound Studios
Atlantic Records albums